The M6 motorway is a north-south motorway in Hungary  running along the Danube connecting Budapest to the seat of Baranya county Pécs, and further south to the Croatian border.

The southernmost Bóly - Ivándárda (border crossing with Croatia) section is currently under construction with a planned inauguration date in 2024. The connecting segment of the A5 in Croatia is also under construction, with the completion scheduled for 2023.

Municipalities
The M6 motorway runs through the following municipalities:
Budapest, Érd, Százhalombatta
Ercsi, Ráckeresztúr, Besnyő, Beloiannisz, Iváncsa, Adony, Kulcs, Rácalmás, Dunaújváros, Baracs, Daruszentmiklós, Előszállás
Dunaföldvár, Bölcske, Paks, Dunaszentgyörgy, Fadd, Tengelic, Tolna, Fácánkert, Szedres, Szekszárd, Őcsény, Decs, Sárpilis, Várdomb, Alsónyék, Bátaszék
Véménd, Palotabozsok, Szebény, Szűr, Himesháza, Székelyszabar, Kisnyárád, Lánycsók, Babarc

Openings timeline
Budapest; M0 – Érdi-tető (7 km): 2008.09.23.
Érdi-tető – Dunaújváros; M8 (68 km): 2006.06.11.
Dunaújváros; M8 – Bóly; M60 (118 km): 2010.03.31.

Junctions, exits and rest areas

Distance from Zero Kilometre Stone (Adam Clark Square) in Budapest in kilometres.

Toll
From February 1, 2015, the M6 motorway is fully charged. The motorway can be used instead of the national sticker with the following county stickers:

Significant artifacts
From Budapest to the Croatian border, the M6 motorway features the following bridges, tunnels or covered cuts:

 Viaducts
 Belső-réti patak Viaduct
 Belső-réti patak Viaduct
 Palotabozsoki-vízfolyás Viaduct
 Szebény Viaduct
 Csele patak Viaduct
 Himesházai árok Viaduct
 Tunnels
 Bátaszék Tunnel – Longest tunnel in Hungary
 Geresd Tunnel
 Baranya Tunnel
 Véménd Tunnel

European Route

See also 

 Roads in Hungary
 Transport in Hungary
 International E-road network

References

External links 

National Toll Payment Services Plc. (in Hungarian, some information also in English)
National Infrastructure Developer Ltd. (in Hungarian)
Exit list of M6 in motorways-exits.com
 Construction works of the new section

6